Love's Masquerade (German: Liebeskarneval) is a 1928 German silent film directed by Augusto Genina and starring Carmen Boni, Hans Junkermann and Olga Engl.

The film's art direction was by Robert Neppach.

Cast
 Carmen Boni as Jacqueline, junge Gräfin  
 Hans Junkermann as Alter Graf  
 Olga Engl as Alte Gräfin  
 Jack Trevor as Schriftsteller  
 Asta Gundt as Geliebte des Schriftstellers  
 Karl Platen as Diener  
 Camilla Spira as Zofe  
 Teddy Bill as Herr im Auto  
 Oreste Bilancia as Freund des Schriftstellers  
 Heinrich Gotho

References

Bibliography
 Alfred Krautz. International directory of cinematographers, set- and costume designers in film, Volume 4. Saur, 1984.

External links

1928 films
Films of the Weimar Republic
German silent feature films
Films directed by Augusto Genina
Films produced by Seymour Nebenzal
Films with screenplays by Franz Schulz
National Film films
German black-and-white films
1920s German-language films